Fevzi Tuncay (born 14 September 1977, in Muğla) is a Turkish football retired goalkeeper .

He became professional in Muğlaspor. He transferred to Beşiktaş in 1997. He played mostly for Beşiktaş J.K. and Malatyaspor. He also played for Gaziantepspor and Malatyaspor. 

He played for Turkey national football team and was a participant at the Euro 2000.

Honours
Beşiktaş J.K.
Turkish Cup: 1997–98
Turkish Super Cup: 1998

Turkey
UEFA Euro 2000 Quarter-Finalist

References

External links
 

1977 births
Living people
Turkish footballers
Turkey international footballers
Turkey B international footballers
Turkey under-21 international footballers
Turkey youth international footballers
Association football goalkeepers
UEFA Euro 2000 players
Manisaspor footballers
Beşiktaş J.K. footballers
Gaziantepspor footballers
Samsunspor footballers
Malatyaspor footballers
Fethiyespor footballers
Diyarbakırspor footballers
Süper Lig players